CPN may refer to:
 Calpine Corporation, New York Stock Exchange symbol CPN
 Canadian Perinatal Network
 Carnivorous Plant Newsletter
 Carpinteria (Amtrak station), California, Amtrak station code CPN
 Caspian Airlines (Iran), ICAO airline designator CPN
 Celiac plexus neurolysis, in medicine, the chemical ablation of the celiac plexus
 Central Park North (disambiguation)
 Central Pattana, Stock Exchange of Thailand symbol CPN
 Chlamydia pneumoniae, generally Cpn or CpN
 Citizen Potawatomi Nation, a federally recognized tribe of Potawatomi people located in Oklahoma
 Clapham North tube station, London, London Underground station code CPN
 Coloured Petri net
 Communist Party of Nepal
 Communist Party of the Netherlands
 Community psychiatric nurse
 Complex projective space, 
 Confederation of the Polish Nobility
 Country and Progressive National Party, early 20th-century political party in Queensland, Australia
 Lysine carboxypeptidase, an enzyme
 Community Protection Notice in the United Kingdom